"45:33" is a six-part composition by American rock band LCD Soundsystem. Commissioned by Nike, it was released digitally as a one-track studio album on October 17, 2006, as part of the Nike+ Original Run series. Initially, it was available exclusively through the Nike Music Store on iTunes. New York-based creative lifestyle marketing and public relations agency Cornerstone helped the musical efforts and coordinated the track. A CD re-release with three bonus tracks was issued by DFA Records on November 12, 2007, with the "45:33" composition also receiving a vinyl release. An eight track remix CD entitled 45:33 Remixes was released September 2009.

Background and composition
The composition was recorded between July and September 2006 at DFA Studios in New York City. The publicity for "45:33" described it as being designed to accompany jogging workouts, "to reward and push at good intervals of a run." An early statement detailed that the composition had been refined after several runs on the treadmill. James Murphy later admitted that this was entirely a lie on his part, and that he does not actually jog. He stated that he wanted to make a long-form record like E2-E4 by Manuel Göttsching and used the opportunity provided by Nike to do so. The artwork of "45:33" also resembles that of Göttsching's work.

Parts of "45:33" were later used on the album Sound of Silver, in particular the track "Someone Great", which appears on "45:33" as an instrumental section later distinguished as track 3. The complete track was also released for registered Nike+ users in late March 2007 as a gift of appreciation when Nike+ logged its 10 millionth mile. The composition was available to be sold by Nike via iTunes for six months. The actual length of the composition is slightly longer than 45:33; the title is instead a reference to the two common vinyl speeds, 45 and 33 RPM. The composition has been described musically as progressive electronic, disco, funk, and synth-pop.

For the last series of concerts at Terminal 5 and Madison Square Garden, LCD Soundsystem performed "45:33" in full during the second set, with "Sound of Silver" replacing Part 3. Part 3 was saved until their performance of "Someone Great". On the digital release of the concert, the 45:33 tracks were titled: "45:33 Intro", "You Can't Hide / Shame On You", "Out In Space" and "Ships Talking".

Re-release

DFA Records announced that "45:33" would be re-released on November 12, 2007. It was made available on CD and vinyl through DFA and EMI. The re-release featured three bonus tracks, "Freak Out/Starry Eyes", James Murphy and Eric Broucek's dub remix of "North American Scum", and "Hippie Priest Bum-out", all of which were B-sides from European versions of Sound of Silver singles. These three tracks would also be made available together separately on the Confuse the Marketplace EP, released on December 11, 2007. "45:33" was re-released as a limited edition white-label vinyl on May 26, 2015.

Critical reception

"45:33" received critical acclaim. On the review aggregator website Metacritic, which assigns a weighted average out of 100 points, the album received an average critic score of 86, based on 25 reviews, indicating "universal acclaim". Manuel Göttsching was, however, critical of the composition, despite it being inspired by his own work, stating: "Musically, there is nothing related to E2-E4 – it's just a 'megamix' of his work."

Track listing

iTunes release

Re-release
Note: The first six tracks are listed simply as "45:33".

Personnel
 James Murphy – drums, percussion, drum programming, handclaps, bass guitar, guitar, vocals, glockenspiel, clavinet, organ, synthesizer, vocoder

Additional personnel

 Alex Frankel – Wurlitzer piano
 Eric Broucek – programming
 Jason Disu – trumpet
 Carter Yasutake – trumpet
 Terra Deva – vocals
 Nancy Whang - vocals (on re-release tracks 7/8/9)

Charts

References

External links
 Official LCD Soundsystem website

2006 EPs
2006 singles
2006 songs
LCD Soundsystem albums
LCD Soundsystem songs
Nike Original Run series
Songs written by James Murphy (electronic musician)